Megachile ceylonica is a species of bee in the family Megachilidae. It was described by Charles Thomas Bingham in 1896.

References

Ceylonica
Insects described in 1896